K.H. Masjkur (EISS: Masykur; 15 December 1917 ‒ 25 December 1994) was the Minister of Religion of Indonesia in the years 1947–1949 and 1953–1955. He was also a member of House of Representatives of Indonesia in 1956–1971 and a member of Supreme Advisory Council in 1968.

Masjkur was prominently involved in the struggle for independence in the days of the Japanese occupation, as a member of the Board of Inquiry Efforts Preparation of Indonesian Independence. Masjkur was also noted as the founder of Homeland Defenders (PETA), a Japanese backed militia made in preparation of a possible allied invasion, and a predecessor to the Indonesian National Armed Forces. When the battle of Surabaya broke out, he was named as the leader of Barisan Sabilillah.

1917 births
1994 deaths
Government ministers of Indonesia
Indonesian collaborators with Imperial Japan
Members of Pembela Tanah Air
Nahdlatul Ulama
People from Malang
Politicians from East Java